The England national cricket team toured New Zealand in February 1991 and played a three-match One Day International (ODI) series against the New Zealand national cricket team. New Zealand won the series 2–1. England were captained by Graham Gooch and New Zealand by Martin Crowe.

One Day Internationals (ODIs)

New Zealand won the Bank of New Zealand Trophy 2-1.

1st ODI

2nd ODI

3rd ODI

References

Sources
 
 Cricket Archive: Bank of New Zealand Trophy 1990/91
 ESPNCricinfo: England tour of New Zealand, 1990/91
 

1991 in New Zealand cricket
1991 in English cricket
International cricket competitions from 1988–89 to 1991
England
1990-91